Trixis californica , the American threefold or American trixis, is a species of flowering plant in the family Asteraceae. It is native to the southwestern United States in California, Arizona, New Mexico, and Texas, and in Mexico in the states of Baja California, Chihuahua, Coahuila, Durango, Nuevo León, Sinaloa, Sonora, Tamaulipas, and Zacatecas.

Trixis californica is one of 22 species in Trixis, a genus that occurs in North America, Central America, the West Indies, northern Argentina, Uruguay, and southern Brazil.

Description
Trixis californica is a sprawling shrub or subshrub with flower heads with about 15 bright yellow flowers each. The inflorescence is terminal, usually a panicle or corymb, but sometimes the heads are borne singly at the tips of branches. Leaves are lance-shaped (lanceolate), dark green, 2–11 cm long, and 0.5–3 cm wide. This species occurs from sea level to 5000 feet in elevation. Its habitat types include rocky hillsides, thorn scrub, and desert washes and brush. In the western Sonoran Desert it is exclusive to washes and only grows amongst other plants. In the Colorado Desert it grows in creosote scrub. It grows in scrub in the Yuma Desert, east of the Colorado River. Though it usually flowers between February and October, it may bloom nearly year-round depending on winter weather conditions.

Uses
The leaves of this species were smoked for pleasure by the Seri of Mexico.  Other uses include administration as an aid to childbirth.

Images

References

 Anderson, C. 1972. A monograph of the Mexican and Central American species of Trixis (Compositae). Memoirs of the New York Botanical Garden 22(3): 1–68.
 C. M. Hogan, ed. 2010.  Trixis californica . Encyclopedia of Life.

External links

Trixis californica treatment. The Jepson Manual.
Trixis californica. Lady Bird Johnson Wildflower Center.
Trixis californica. Northern Arizona Flora.
Trixis californica photo gallery. CalPhotos.

californica
Flora of the California desert regions
Flora of the Sonoran Deserts
Flora of Arizona
Flora of New Mexico
Flora of Texas
Flora of Baja California
Flora of Chihuahua (state)
Flora of Coahuila
Flora of Durango
Flora of Nuevo León
Flora of Sinaloa
Flora of Sonora
Flora of Tamaulipas
Flora of Zacatecas
Flora of the Chihuahuan Desert
Natural history of the Mojave Desert
Flora of the Rio Grande valleys
Least concern flora of North America
Least concern flora of the United States
Plants described in 1862